Jeff Kevin (born 1944) is an Australian actor and theatre director best known for portraying Arnold Feather in 338 episodes from 1972-1977 in television soap opera Number 96, his character was involved in numerous iconic storyline's including his marriage of Patti Olsen and mourning her subsequent death at the hands of the Pantyhose strangler and following for in love with Robyn Ross, unbeknownst to him Ross is transgender. this storyarc broke ground for a serial at the time in that portrayor in cabaret artist Carlotta, was the first transgender actress to portray a transgender character anywhere in the world

Career
In the late 1960s and early 1970s, Kevin made several television guest appearances, including roles in the Crawford Productions police dramas Homicide and Division 4, and in police dramas The Long Arm and The Link Men.

In 1972 Kevin was cast in the comedic role of 19-year-old unlucky-in-love Arnold Feather in the soap opera Number 96, although Kevin was already 27 at the time. The role was created by series screenwriter Johnny Whyte. Feather continued in the role from mid-1972 until the series ended in August 1977. He also appeared in the series' 1974 spinoff film, Number 96. During 1977 Arnold was briefly phased out and replaced by his twin brother Charles "Chook" Feather, also played by Kevin.

In the late 1970s he acted in the serial The Sullivans and made an appearance in Skyways. In 1988 he briefly acted in the soap opera Home and Away as Catholic priest Father Rawlings

After leaving the acting profession Kevin became a drama lecturer at Wollongong University before retiring in 2003.

Personal life
Kevin married English-born Australian actress and model Suzanne Church (born in United Kingdom in August 1977; Church had also appeared in Number 96, as Jane Chester.

Filmography

References

External links
 

Australian male television actors
Living people
1944 births